Rosasia is an extinct genus of bothremydid pleurodiran turtle that was discovered in the Argilas de Aveiro Formation of Portugal. The genus consists of a single species, R. soutoi, named after Alberto Souto.

References 

Prehistoric turtle genera
Late Cretaceous turtles
Fossils of Portugal 
Bothremydidae 
Maastrichtian life
Campanian life
Cretaceous Europe
Fossil taxa described in 1940